Bhanuprasad Bholanath Trived (born 16 January 1931) is Gujarati novelist, playwright and poet from Gujarat, India.

Life
Bhanuprasad Trivedi was born on 16 January 1931 at Vavol village (now in Gandhinagar district, Gujarat). He passed matriculation in 1949 and completed B. A. with Gujarati and Sanskrit in 1955 and M. A. in same subjects in 1967. He taught for nine years at schools in Linch and Kherva in Mehsana district. He served as a principal in school of Chitroda, Sabarkantha in 1962-63 and of school in Pratapnagar from 1963 to 1969. He served as a professor in C. U. Shah Arts College, Ahmedabad until his retirement in 1970.

Works
His first novel Ek Hatu Amdavad (1981) is set in Ahmedabad and centered on a journey of man from serving as a school librarian to becoming a professor. Shalvan (1984) is about a protagonist finding what was lost by her. His Sheshpatra (1989) is a satire novel on corruption in fourteen chapters covering seventeen characters. Vikshipta (1993) is his fourth novel.
Moment (1974) is a collection of six one-act plays. Alasgamana (1975) is collection of 53 poems while Sangat (1975) is collection of songs. His other works are Chandan ane Sadhu, Abhyantar.

Recognition
He received critics’ award in 1984 and 1989. His one-act play collection Moment received the prize of Government of Gujarat.

References

1931 births
Living people
Poets from Gujarat
Gujarati-language writers
Indian male novelists
Indian male dramatists and playwrights
People from Gandhinagar district
20th-century Indian dramatists and playwrights
20th-century Indian novelists
Novelists from Gujarat
Dramatists and playwrights from Gujarat
20th-century Indian male writers